Scharlau is a German language habitational surname. Notable people with the name include:

 Charles E. Scharlau (1845–1903), American soldier
 Winfried Scharlau (1940–2020), German mathematician

References 

German-language surnames
German toponymic surnames